Amosan is an oral antiseptic rinse. It contains 68.635% sodium perborate monohydrate by weight. Sold as a powder customarily packaged in 1.7g envelopes, it reconstitution with warm water, after which it is used as a mouth rinse. It is used to aid in the prevention of, as well as speed the recovery from canker sores, denture irritation, orthodontic irritation, and oral injuries or after dental procedures.

History 
Amosan was originally made by Oral-B; a mention of the powder appeared in the February 6, 1970 Federal Register. Between 2005 and 2010, Amosan was manufactured in Belgium and sold under the Oral-B brand, belonging to Procter & Gamble after its 2005 acquisition of Gillette. In December 2010, its use was banned in the EU, as the product is based on borate, which the union considers "carcinogenic, mutagenic, or toxic for reproduction".

Vintage Brands Limited began manufacturing and selling Amosan Oral Antiseptic Rinse in 2014 because many consumers were disappointed that it was no longer available. Product review pages on Amazon and public comment forums elsewhere indicate a high level of frustration with the discontinuation by users who could find no effective alternative treatment.

A similar, if not identical product, also manufactured under the Oral-B brand name, called Bocasan was once distributed in the UK, but appears to have been discontinued some time after 2003.

In April 2012, it was reported that Shoppers Drug Mart in Canada had produced a comparable product under their house brand: 'Life Brand Oral Wound Cleanser'. Also, Jean Coutu and Rexall has their own house brand versions.

Mechanism of action 
The active ingredient, sodium perborate monohydrate, is quickly hydrolyzed into hydrogen peroxide and borate on contact with water.

An 1979 recent double-blind crossover study suggests that hydrogen peroxide, which is released during the use of this product, may prevent or retard colonization and multiplication of anaerobic bacteria, such as those that inhabit oral wounds.

Drug facts
 Active ingredient: Sodium perborate monohydrate 1.2 g
 Inactive ingredients: L-Tartaric acid, sodium saccharin, flavors
 Purpose: Oral wound cleanser
 Normal use: Use up to 4 times daily, after meals and before bedtime or as directed by a dentist or physician

References 

Antiseptics
Oral hygiene
Dental equipment